Dasht-e Barm (also known as Dasht-e Bar) is a village in Dasht-e Barm Rural District, Kuhmareh District, Kazerun County, Fars Province, Iran. At the 2006 census, its population was 472, in 89 families.

References 

Populated places in Kazerun County